Terry Bishop (21 October 1912 – 30 October 1981) was a British screenwriter, and television and film director. During the 1950s and 60s he worked extensively in British TV, directing episodes of series such as The Adventures of William Tell, The Adventures of Robin Hood, Sword of Freedom, Danger Man, and Sir Francis Drake. He also made several low budget British films during this time, perhaps the best known of which is Cover Girl Killer (1959), featuring Steptoe and Son star Harry H. Corbett as a serial murderer of glamour models.

Selected filmography
Director
 Western Isles (1941) - Documentary
 Steel Goes to Sea (1941) - Scenario
 Daybreak in Udi (1949) - Oscar Recipient for Best Documentary in 1950
 Model for Murder (1959)
 Life in Danger (1959)
 Cover Girl Killer (1959)
 Danger Tomorrow (1960)
 The Unstoppable Man (1960)
 Bomb in the High Street (1961)
 Hair of the Dog (1962)
 Hamlet (1964)

References

External links 
 

1912 births
1981 deaths
British film directors
20th-century British screenwriters